The 2015–16 Central Michigan Chippewas women's basketball team represents Western Michigan University during the 2015–16 NCAA Division I women's basketball season. The Broncos, led by fourth year head coach Shane Clipfell, play their home games at University Arena as members of the West Division of the Mid-American Conference. They finished the season 17–15, 8–10 in MAC play to fifth place of the East division. They advanced to the quarterfinals of the MAC women's tournament where they lost to Central Michigan.

Roster

Schedule and results
Source: 

|-
!colspan="9" style="background:#6a3e0f; color:#e3bc85;"| Exhibition

|-
!colspan="9" style="background:#6a3e0f; color:#e3bc85;"| Non-conference games

|-
!colspan="9" style="background:#6a3e0f; color:#e3bc85;"| MAC regular season

|-
!colspan="9" style="background:#6a3e0f; color:#e3bc85;"| MAC Women's Tournament

See also
 2015–16 Western Michigan Broncos men's basketball team

References

Western Michigan
Western Michigan Broncos women's basketball seasons